Women's World Chess Championship 2018 can refer to two separate contests in 2018. In that year, World Chess Federation FIDE exceptionally held two consecutive women's championships. 

 Women's World Chess Championship 2018 (May)
 Women's World Chess Championship 2018 (November)